Mount Vernon High School is a public high school in Mount Vernon, Texas, United States. It is part of the Mount Vernon Independent School District and classified as a 3A school by the University Interscholastic League. In 2015, the school was rated "Met Standard" by the Texas Education Agency.

Athletics
The Mount Vernon Tigers compete in these sports:
Baseball
Basketball
Cheerleading
Cross Country
Football
Golf
Powerlifting
Softball
Tennis
Track and Field
Volleyball

The 1948 Boys Basketball championship team was coached by Milburn "Catfish" Smith who won the title undefeated. In 2019, the school hired Art Briles, who had been previously fired from Baylor for his prominent role in their sexual assault scandal, as their head football coach.

State titles
Boys Basketball
1948(1A)
Girls Basketball
2018 (3A) state champions 
Softball
1994(3A)
One Act Play
2000(3A), 2004(3A), 2014(2A)
Spirit (Cheerleading)
2016 3A State Champions (UIL Pilot Year)
2017 3A state champions 
2018 3A state champions

Notable alumni
Judd Hambrick
Butch Maples
Don Meredith

Notable faculty
Art Briles

References

Schools in Franklin County, Texas
Public high schools in Texas